The Queen Anne's Bounty Act 1703 (2 & 3 Anne c 20) was an Act of the Parliament of England, granting "in Perpetuity the Revenues of the First Fruits and Tenths" for the support of the poor clergy of England.

The whole Act, so far as not otherwise repealed, was repealed by section 48(2) of, and Part II of Schedule 7 to, the Charities Act 1960.

Section 1
This section was repealed by section 39(1) of, and Schedule 5 to, the Charities Act 1960.

Section 2
This section was repealed by section 6 of, and Schedule 2 to, the First Fruits and Tenths Measure 1926 (No 5).

Section 3
This section was repealed by section 6 of, and Schedule 2 to, the First Fruits and Tenths Measure 1926 (No 5).

Section 4
In this section, the words from "inrolled in such manner" to "bargaines and sales" and the word "inrolled" where thereafter occurring were repealed section 1 of, and Schedule 1 to, the Statute Law Revision Act 1948.

Section 6
In this section, the words "or women covert without their husbands" were repealed by section 5(2) of, and Schedule 2 to, the Law Reform (Married Women and Tortfeasors) Act 1935.

Section 7
This section was repealed by section 6 of, and Schedule 2 to, the First Fruits and Tenths Measure 1926 (No 5).

See also
Queen Anne's Bounty

References
Halsbury's Statutes

Acts of the Parliament of England
1703 in law
1703 in England